The Magic House is a not-for-profit children's museum located in Kirkwood, Missouri, just outside St. Louis. The Magic House opened as a children's museum in 1979 with the mission of engaging children in hands-on learning experiences that encourage experimentation, creativity and the development of problem-solving skills within a place of beauty, wonder, joy and magic. The Magic House has gained recognition as one of the nation's top children's museums, and was ranked the nation's #1 attraction based on child appeal by Zagat U.S. Family Travel Guide. The Museum attracts more than 560,000 visitors per year and since its opening has been visited by more than 12 million people.

History
In addition to serving as a major cultural attraction for the region, The Magic House holds a special place in the history of St. Louis. The original Victorian style house built in 1901 belonged to the George Lane Edwards Family. Edwards was a managing partner in his family's brokerage firm, A.G. Edwards & Sons, as well as the first president of the St. Louis Stock Exchange and a director of the Louisiana Purchase Exposition.  The second and third floors of the original Museum currently house exhibits chronicling the lives of the Edwards family to give visitors a historical perspective of the house and an inside look into life in the early twentieth century. The Magic House was founded by two St. Louis women, Jody Newman and Barbie Freund, who volunteered three years of their time to create a cultural institution that would be both educational and fun. When the Museum first opened its doors in October 1979, the facilities were designed to accommodate 30,000 visitors each year, however, during its first year of operations, the Museum welcomed 165,000 guests. Since its inaugural year, The Magic House has undergone several renovations and expansions.
 
The first expansion took place in 1985, when The Magic House opened a 2,000-square-foot area designed exclusively for children ages 1 to 6 called, "A Little Bit of Magic." In 1989, an addition was constructed on the front and south side of the house. This included a large wrap-around porch, an expanded lobby and an elevator that allowed the Museum to be accessible to all visitors. In 1997, the Museum underwent a major expansion which added the Children's Village, Math Path, Fitness Center and an Education Wing. In 2001, The Magic House opened Backyard Magic, an outdoor facility featuring a Victorian Education Pavilion, a Children's Sculpture Garden and an outdoor Exhibit Patio. Again in 2008, The Magic House underwent a major expansion as it added a 25,000-square-foot addition nearly doubling the size of the Museum. In 2005, "A Little Bit of Magic" was transformed into the hands on STEM exhibit, WonderWorks.

Programs/ Operations
The Magic House is a self-supporting 501 (c)(3) not-for-profit organization that relies on the generous support of individual, foundation and corporate donors. 80 percent of funding comes from earned revenue sources such as admissions, the gift shop and the Picnic Basket Cafe. The Magic House does not receive ongoing public support from tax revenue. In addition to daily operations and admissions at the museum, The Magic House provides outreach programs, field trips and special events. Over 50,000 students participate in field trips at The Magic House annually. With support from several corporations and foundations, The Magic House is able to bring educational outreach programs to schools, libraries and hospitals, reaching more than 25,000 children each year. The Star Society annual fund, the Education Program Fund and support from private foundations and corporations provide free field trips, outreach programs and other hands-on learning experiences for children, families and schools in need. The Magic House also provides events and programs for special populations including military families, seriously ill youth, special needs youth and foster children. In addition to paid staff, The Magic House relies on more than 250 adult and youth volunteers each year.  In 2015, there were a total 6,116 volunteer hours donated to The Magic House. The Magic House is a member of the American Alliance of Museums and the Association of Children's Museums.

Notable Exhibits
The Magic House has an indoor area of over 55,000 square feet in four levels. The Museum is home to hundreds of hands-on exhibits. Some of the more notable exhibits include

• Electro-Static Generator: One of the most recognizable exhibits at The Magic House, the Van de Graaff generator allows visitors to experience the sensation of static electricity. Touching the generator causes visitors’ hair to stand on end, making for a popular photo opportunity.
   

• The Children's Village: A large play area that encourages children to use their imaginations and to work together in a miniature community, the Children's Village was a part of the 1997 expansion. The village includes among other things a mock market, bank, veterinary clinic, and library.

• Jack and the Beanstalk Climber: Based on the fairy tale Jack and the Beanstalk, the climber allows children to climb up and down three full floors.

• Star-Spangled Center: Consisting of an Oval Office, Courtroom and Legislative chamber, the Star-Spangled Center was part of the 2008 expansion of The Magic House. Through hands on exhibits and trivia, The Star-Spangled Center has the mission of encouraging interest in government and civic engagement.

• Mizzou Training Center:  Opened in 2016 the Mizzou Training Center allows visitors to test their own skills while learning about physical fitness and health. The exhibit is funded by former Magic House board member and Mizzou Alumnus Dave Spence and his wife Suzie. It features player jerseys, equipment and helmets.

• Wonderworks: Opened in 2015, Wonderworks lets younger visitors dig in the sand, crawl through tunnels, race a car down an inclined plane, suspend balls in midair, examine creatures under a microscope, climb aboard a submersible, draw a fish and watch it swim.

Other Notable Areas
• Backyard Magic: Opened in 2001, the Backyard Magic area features a large Victorian Education Pavilion, a Children's Sculpture Garden and an outdoor Exhibit Patio that houses Sandcastle Beach; a seasonal exhibit featuring sand sculpture by Dan Belcher.

• Picnic Basket Café: The Picnic Basket Café is a restaurant within The Magic House, which serves salads, sandwiches, soups, and snacks made with fresh ingredients and whole grains. Using almost entirely recycled material for the furniture, the café has been recognized by the Green Dining Alliance as the, “Greenest Restaurant in St. Louis.”

• Play Port at Lambert St. Louis International Airport: The St. Louis International Play Port, located in concourse C at Gate C2 in the St. Louis Airport, is a 1,500 sq. ft. exhibit that features planes, trains, and automobiles.

See also
List of museums in Missouri
St. Louis
Kirkwood, Missouri

References

Museums in St. Louis County, Missouri
Children's museums in Missouri
Tourist attractions in St. Louis
Buildings and structures in St. Louis County, Missouri
1979 establishments in Missouri